Seyyed Abolhassan Banisadr (22 March 1933 – 9 October 2021) was an Iranian politician, writer, and political dissident. He was the first president of Iran after the 1979 Iranian Revolution abolished the monarchy, serving from February 1980 until his impeachment by parliament in June 1981. Prior to his presidency, he was the minister of foreign affairs in the interim government. He had resided for many years in France where he co-founded the National Council of Resistance of Iran.

Following his impeachment, Banisadr fled Iran and found political asylum in France. Banisadr later focused on political writings about his activities during the Iranian revolution and his critiques of the Iranian government. He became a critic of Supreme Leader Ali Khamenei and the country's handling of its 2009 elections.

Early life and education
Banisadr was born on 22 March 1933 in Hamadān. His father was an ayatollah and close to Ruhollah Khomeini. Banisadr studied law, theology, and sociology at University of Tehran. In the 1960s, he studied finance and economics at the Sorbonne. In 1972, Banisadr's father died and he attended the funeral in Iraq, where he first met Ayatollah Khomeini.

His father, seyyed Nasrollah Banisadr migrated to the Hamadan area from Qazi Qushchi village in Bijar in Kurdistan province.

Banisadr participated in the anti-Shah student movement during the early 1960s and was imprisoned twice, and was wounded during an uprising in 1963, which led to his fleeing to France. He later joined the Iranian resistance group led by Khomeini, becoming one of his hard-line advisors. Banisadr returned to Iran together with Khomeini as the revolution was beginning in February 1979. He wrote a book on Islamic finance, Eghtesad Tohidi, which roughly translates as "The Economics of Monotheism."

Career
Following the Iranian Revolution, Banisadr became deputy minister of finance on 4 February 1979 and was in office until 27 February 1979. He also became a member of the revolutionary council when Bazargan and others left the council to form the interim government. After the resignation of the interim finance minister Ali Ardalan on 27 February 1979, he was appointed finance minister by then prime minister Mehdi Bazargan. On 12 November 1979, Banisadr was appointed foreign minister to replace Ebrahim Yazdi in the government that was led by the Council of the Islamic Revolution when the interim government resigned.

Banisadr was elected to a four-year term as president on 25 January 1980, receiving 78.9 percent of the vote in the election, and was inaugurated on 4 February. Khomeini remained the Supreme Leader of Iran with the constitutional authority to dismiss the president. The inaugural ceremonies were held at the hospital where Khomeini was recovering from a heart ailment.

Banisadr was not an Islamic cleric; Khomeini had insisted that clerics should not run for positions in the government. In August and September 1980, Banisadr survived two helicopter crashes near the Iran–Iraq border. During the Iran–Iraq War, Banisadr was appointed acting commander-in-chief by Khomeini on 10 June 1981.

Impeachment
The Majlis (Iran's Parliament) impeached Banisadr in his absence on 21 June 1981, allegedly because of his moves against the clerics in power, in particular Mohammad Beheshti, then head of the judicial system. Khomeini himself appears to have instigated the impeachment, which he signed the next day. According to Kenneth Katzman, Banisadr believed the clerics should not directly govern Iran and was perceived as supporting the People's Mujahedin of Iran. Only one deputy, Salaheddin Bayani, spoke in favor of Banisadr during his impeachment.

Even before Khomeini had signed the impeachment papers, the Revolutionary Guard had seized the Presidential buildings and gardens, and imprisoned writers at a newspaper closely tied to Banisadr. Over the next few days, they executed several of his closest friends, including Hossein Navab, Rashid Sadrolhefazi, and Manouchehr Massoudi. Ayatollah Hussein-Ali Montazeri was among the few people in the government who remained in support of Banisadr, but he was soon stripped of his powers.

At the same time, the Iranian government outlawed all political parties, except the Islamic Republican Party. Government forces arrested and imprisoned members of other parties, such as the People's Mujahedin, Fadaian Khalq, Tudeh, and Paikar.

Banisadr went into hiding for a few days before his removal, and hid in Tehran, protected by the People's Mujahedin (PMOI). He attempted to organize an alliance of anti-Khomeini factions to retake power, including the PMOI, KDP, and the Fedaian Organisation (Minority), while eschewing any contact with monarchist exile groups. He met numerous times while in hiding with PMOI leader Massoud Rajavi to plan an alliance, but after the execution on 27 July of PMOI member Mohammadreza Saadati, Banisadr and Rajavi concluded that it was unsafe to remain in Iran.

In Banisadr's view, this impeachment was a coup d'état against democracy in Iran. In order to settle the political differences in the country, President Banisadr had asked for a referendum.

Flight and exile
When Banisadr was impeached on 21 June 1981, he had fled and had been hiding in western Iran. On 29 July, Banisadr and Massoud Rajavi were smuggled aboard an Iranian Air Force Boeing 707 piloted by Colonel Behzad Moezzi. It followed a routine flight plan before deviating out of Iranian groundspace to Turkish airspace and eventually landing in Paris.  As a disguise, Banisadr shaved his eyebrows and mustache and dressed in a skirt.

Banisadr and Rajavi found political asylum in Paris, conditional on abstaining from anti-Khomeini activities in France. This restriction was effectively ignored after France evacuated its embassy in Tehran. Banisadr, Rajavi, and the Kurdish Democratic Party set up the National Council of Resistance of Iran in Paris in October 1981. Banisadr soon fell out with Rajavi, however, accusing him of ideologies favoring dictatorship and violence. Furthermore, Banisadr opposed the armed opposition as initiated and sustained by Rajavi, and sought support for Iran during the war with Iraq.

My Turn to Speak
In 1991, Banisadr released an English translation of his 1989 text My Turn to Speak: Iran, the Revolution and Secret Deals with the U.S. In the book, Banisadr alleged covert dealings between the Ronald Reagan presidential campaign and leaders in Tehran to prolong the Iran hostage crisis before the 1980 United States presidential election. He also claimed that Henry Kissinger plotted to set up a Palestinian state in the Iranian province of Khuzestan and that Zbigniew Brzezinski conspired with Saddam Hussein to plot Iraq's 1980 invasion of Iran.

Lloyd Grove of The Washington Post wrote: "The book is not what normally passes for a bestseller. Cobbled together from a series of interviews conducted by French journalist Jean-Charles Deniau, it is never merely direct when it can be enigmatic, never just simple when it can be labyrinthine." In a review for Foreign Affairs, William B. Quandt described the book as "a rambling, self-serving series of reminiscences" and "long on sensational allegations and devoid of documentation that might lend credence to Bani-Sadr's claims." Kirkus Reviews called it "an interesting—though frequently incredible and consistently self-serving-memoir" and said "frequent sensational accusations render his tale an eccentric, implausible commentary on the tragic folly of the Iranian Revolution."

Views

Banisadr, in a 2008 interview with the Voice of America on the 29th anniversary of the revolution, claimed that Khomeini was directly responsible for the violence originated from the Muslim world and that the promises Khomeini made in exile were broken after the revolution. In July 2009, Banisadr publicly denounced the Iranian government's conduct after the disputed presidential election: "Khamenei ordered the fraud in the presidential elections and the ensuing crackdown on protesters." He said the government was "holding on to power solely by means of violence and terror" and accused its leaders of amassing wealth for themselves, to the detriment of other Iranians.

In published articles on the 2009 Iranian presidential election protests, he ascribed the unusually open political climate before the election to the government's great need to prove its legitimacy. He also said the government had lost all legitimacy. The spontaneous uprising had cost the government its political legitimacy, and Supreme Leader Ayatollah Ali Khamenei's threats led to the violent crackdown, which cost the government its religious legitimacy.

Personal life and death
Beginning in 1981, Banisadr lived in Versailles, near Paris, in a villa closely guarded by French police. Banisadr's daughter, Firoozeh, married Massoud Rajavi in Paris following their exile. They later divorced and the alliance between him and Rajavi also ended.

After a long illness, Banisadr died at Pitié-Salpêtrière Hospital in Paris on 9 October 2021, at age 88. He is buried in Versailles, in the cemetery of Gonards.

Books
 Touhid Economics, 1980
 My Turn to Speak: Iran, the Revolution and Secret Deals with the U.S. Washington, D.C.: Potomac Books, 1991. . Translation of Le complot des ayatollahs. Paris: La Découverte, 1989
 Le Coran et le pouvoir: principes fondamentaux du Coran, Imago, 1993
 Dignity in the 21st Century,  Doris Schroeder and Abol-Hassan Banisadr, with translation by Mahmood Delkhasteh and Sarah Amsler
 books after 1980

See also
 October Surprise conspiracy theory

References

External links

 Abolhassan Banisadr's website (in Persian)

|-

|-

 
1933 births
2021 deaths
Finance ministers of Iran
Foreign ministers of Iran
Presidents of Iran
People from Hamadan
University of Paris alumni
Iranian emigrants to France
National Front (Iran) student activists
People of the Iranian Revolution
Iran hostage crisis
Iranian revolutionaries
Exiles of the Iranian Revolution in France
Candidates in the 1980 Iranian presidential election
Commanders-in-Chief of Iran
Council of the Islamic Revolution members
Impeached Iranian officials removed from office
Members of the Assembly of Experts for Constitution
Iranian people of the Iran–Iraq War
Office for the Cooperation of the People with the President politicians
National Council of Resistance of Iran members